The Nose is a 1977 Soviet TV drama film, directed by Rolan Bykov based on the novel by Nikolai Gogol.

Plot 
The action takes place in St. Petersburg in the first half of the 19th century as well. The barber Ivan Yakovlevich, breakfast, found in a loaf of freshly baked bread someone's nose. If you try to get rid of the strange discoveries he was detained by police.

With the collegiate assessor Kovalev occurred unpleasant story. One fine morning he found his nose. Moreover, this important part of his face had healed their lives.

Cast
 Rolan Bykov as Collegiate Assessor Kovalev / Kovalev's Nose / Ivan Yakovlevich the Barber / farmer, wandering horses with baggage
 Zinaida Slavina as Praskovya Osipovna, Ivan Yakovlevich's wife
 Iya Savvina as woman of easy virtue
 Zinaida Sharko as head officer's Podtochina
 Elena Sanayeva as Podtochina's daughter
Boryslav Brondukov an Ivan, Kovalev's servant
Georgi Burkov as quarterly warden
 Lev Durov as a private bailiff
Yevgeny Yevstigneyev as official newspaper of the expedition
 Vladimir Basov as doctor
 Valentin Nikulin as janitor
Yuri Bogatyryov as Emperor Nicholas I of Russia
 Semyon Morozov as servant of the Countess
 Vladimir Fyodorov as dwarf

Features 
The script of the film is close to the story of Gogol. Small differences are in the individual replicas of characters and minor details. So, for example, the story mentions only that Kovalev wrote a letter to Podtochina, and the text of the letter is given. The film also shows Subtotal and her daughter at the time they receive and read the letter.

In the final, the film and the story completely diverge. In the story Kovalev, having found his nose in the same place, continues to live a normal life. In the film Kovalev gets back his nose, a new rank, marries and dies from an overabundance of feelings. Near the grave of Kovalev (in the film) is the grave of Ivan Aleksandrovich Khlestakov, the main hero of Gogol The Government Inspector.

References

External links
 

1977 drama films
Films set in the 19th century
Films set in the Russian Empire
Films set in Saint Petersburg
Soviet drama films
Russian drama films
1977 television films
1977 films
1970s Russian-language films
Films based on works by Nikolai Gogol
Films directed by Rolan Bykov
Cultural depictions of Nicholas I of Russia